Koromogawa No. 3 Dam  is a rockfill dam located in Iwate Prefecture in Japan. The dam is used for flood control. The catchment area of the dam is 15.4 km2. The dam impounds about 17  ha of land when full and can store 1790 thousand cubic meters of water. The construction of the dam was started on 1972 and completed in 1987.

See also
List of dams in Japan

References

Dams in Iwate Prefecture